John T. Smith (May 1801March 30, 1864) was an American banker and politician who served as a Democratic member of the U.S. House of Representatives for Pennsylvania's 3rd congressional district from 1843 to 1845.

Early life and education
Smith was born in Carlisle, Pennsylvania in 1801, and educated locally.

Career
He resided in the Philadelphia area, where he was active in banking as an officer and member of the board of directors at the Kensington Bank, of which he was President from 1854 to 1863.  In addition, he was a member of the Board of Trustees at the Manufacturers’ and Mechanics’ Beneficial Savings Institution in Philadelphia’s Northern Liberties district.

A Democrat, Smith was elected to the United States House of Representatives from Pennsylvania’s 3rd District in 1842, and he served one term, March 4, 1843 to March 3, 1845.

Smith served for several years on the Board of Commissioners for Northern Liberties (now part of Philadelphia), and was the board’s President from 1840 to 1843 and 1846 to 1849.  In addition, he served in appointive positions including Inspector of the Philadelphia County Prison.

Notes

References

 
The Political Graveyard
John T. Smith elected President of the Kensington Bank in The Bankers' Magazine, and Statistical Register, Volume 8, Part 2, January 1854
John T. Smith, Member of the Board of Directors of the Kensington Bank in McElroy's Philadelphia City Directory
John T. Smith, member of the Board of Trustees of the Manufacturers’ and Mechanics’ Beneficial Savings Institution in McElroy's Philadelphia City Directory
John T. Smith in Annual Report of the Inspectors of the Philadelphia County Prison, Volume 8, 1855-1866

1801 births
1864 deaths
19th-century American politicians
American bank presidents
Burials at Laurel Hill Cemetery (Philadelphia)
Democratic Party members of the United States House of Representatives from Pennsylvania
People from Carlisle, Pennsylvania
Politicians from Philadelphia
19th-century American businesspeople